New Intentions is Ugandan film written and directed by Kihire Kennedy starring Ife Piankhi, Sinovella Night, Kawooya Malcolm, and Joel Okuyo Atiku. The film was released on 3 May 2016 at Uganda National Cultural Centre (UNCC). The film is nominated in six categories at the 2016 Uganda Film Festival including Best Screenplay, Best Sound, Best cinematography, Film of the Year, Best lead Actress and Best Feature Film, Best film director/Film of year.

Plot 

A couple of bankers decide to be foster parents when they adopt an orphaned girl “Wellona” after discovering billions of money in her name at their bank. The money that she by default inherited from her deceased parents. In adopting her unaware of her own worth, they believe they will get an awesome share of the money. Unfortunately, the foster mother falls ill in a coma for months, then their master plan drastically changes to a journey of lust, secrecy and betrayal where pretty Wellona falls a victim and has to endure.

Cast 

 Ife Piankhi as Mrs. Siki Margaret
 John Wayne Muganza as Mr. Benon
 Joel Okuyo Atiku as Counsel Douglas
 Sinovella Night as Wellona
 Kawooya Malcolm as Blake
 Usama Mukwaya as Bruno
 Abha Kalsi as Mama Kamlha
 Doreen Mirembe

Awards

Nominated
 2016: Best Screenplay, Best Sound, Best Best Cinematography, Best lead Actress and Best Feature Film, Best film director/Film of year - Uganda Film Festival Awards

See also
Balikoowa in the City

References

External links 
 

Ugandan drama films
Films shot in Uganda
2016 films